Demon Quest is an audio play in five episodes based on the long-running British science fiction television series Doctor Who. It is written by Paul Magrs, and stars Tom Baker as the Fourth Doctor and Richard Franklin as Captain Mike Yates. It was released on five CDs by BBC Audiobooks between September and December 2010 and is a sequel to 2009's Hornets' Nest.  They feature multiple actors, but all five episodes contain some degree of narration by different characters. It was first broadcast in 10 half-hour episodes on BBC Radio 4 Extra from 19 to 30 December 2016.

Demon Quest

The Relics of Time

(released 2 September 2010)
 The Doctor returns to Nest Cottage in Sussex a year after defeating the alien Hornets.  But while doing some maintenance on the TARDIS, his housekeeper, Mrs Wibbsey takes four pieces of the ship's spatial geometer and trades them to a mysterious figure for four paper items that seem to have some relation to the Doctor.  Now they must travel throughout time to learn their significance and find the missing components.  The first item is a page from a history book discussing a Mosaic that depicts the Doctor's face.  So he and Wibbsey go back to Ancient Britain, c. 43 AD, shortly before Emperor Claudius' Roman invasion.  There they find two warring tribes, one of which is being aided by a wise wizard.

Cast

 The Doctor – Tom Baker
 Mrs Wibbsey – Susan Jameson
 The Wizard – Nigel Anthony
 Female Warrior – Kate Sachs
 Male Warrior – Rupert Holliday-Evans

The Demon of Paris
(released 7 October 2010)
 The Doctor takes Mrs Wibbsey to Paris in 1894 to discover why his face is on a famous Aristide Bruant poster by Toulouse-Lautrec. But a spate of disappearances has sent the city into a panic, and some suspect the famous diminutive artist.  While the Doctor finds himself performing at the Moulin Rouge, Mrs Wibbsey becomes Lautrec's newest muse.  Finally they all come together in a deadly showdown in Montmartre Cemetery with the Demon of Paris.

Cast
 The Doctor – Tom Baker
 Mrs Wibbsey – Susan Jameson
 La Concierge – Rowena Cooper
 La Charlotte – Finty Williams
 Lautrec – Mark Meadows
 Drunk Artist – Rupert Holliday-Evans

A Shard of Ice
(released 4 November 2010)
 Page 407 of an old, leather-bound book of fairy tales features an illustration of a horned monster battling both the Doctor and Retired Captain Mike Yates.  So the Doctor reunites with his old UNIT colleague and takes him to a snow blind Germanic landscape in 1847.  The first person they meet is the very man listed as the book's author, Albert Tiermann, storyteller to the King.  Together the three men confront the Ice Queen, resplendent upon her diamond throne.

Cast
 The Doctor – Tom Baker
 Captain Mike Yates – Richard Franklin
 The Ice Queen – Jan Francis
 Albert Tiermann – Samuel West
 Frau Herz – Carole Boyd
 Hans the footman – Tom Lawrence

Starfall
(released 2 December 2010)
 The final item, the cover of a comic book featuring all their likenesses, brings the Doctor, Yates and Wibbsey to New York City in July 1976.  While walking through Central Park with her boyfriend, a girl named Alice touches a strange meteorite.  This immediately gives her superpowers, transforming her into Miss Starfall.  As she enjoys flying over the city and fighting crime, her employer, a washed up old actress named Mimsy Loyne, impatiently waits in her room at the Dakota Building.  And on the Dakota's top floor, a cult of men in long, multi-coloured scarves are worshiping an alien artefact.

Cast
 The Doctor – Tom Baker
 Mrs Wibbsey – Susan Jameson
 Captain Mike Yates – Richard Franklin
 Mimsy Loyne – Lorelei King
 Buddy Hudson – Trevor White
 Alice Trefusis – Laurel Lefkow
 Cultist – John Chancer
 Cop – Rupert Holliday-Evans

Sepulchre
(released 2 December 2010)
 The Demon has absconded with Mrs Wibbsey.  Yates and the Doctor put together the final given clues to track them down to the very edge of the universe: Sepulchre.

Cast
 The Doctor – Tom Baker
 Mrs Wibbsey – Susan Jameson
 Captain Mike Yates – Richard Franklin
 The Demon – Nigel Anthony
 Elderly Ernestina – Carole Boyd

Crew
Writer – Paul Magrs
Producer & Director – Kate Thomas
Script Editor & Executive Producer – Michael Stevens
Cover Illustrators – Ben Willsher, Anthony Dry, Vince McIndoe (The Demon of Paris) and June Hudson (A Shard of Ice)

Continuity
 This story is a sequel to Hornets' Nest, with the Fourth Doctor, Yates and Mrs Wibbsey reunited one year later.
 Ernestina Stott was in the second Hornets' Nest story, The Dead Shoes.
 The end of Demon Quest leads directly into the sequel, Serpent Crest.
 Mrs Wibbsey's friend, Deirdre "Whatsit", is heard in the last two episodes of Serpent Crest.

Notes
 Rupert Holliday-Evans played Colonel Mace in "The Sontaran Stratagem" / "The Poison Sky".
 Samuel West played Cyrian, the Rani's sidekick, in the 1993 Doctor Who charity special Dimensions in Time.
 The Fourth Doctor's trademark scarf was inspired by Lautrec's Bruant paintings.
 The cover of A Shard of Ice was illustrated by June Hudson, costume designer for Doctor Who in Tom Baker's final years.

References

External links
 Press Release
 BBC Store
 Big Finish Store
 AudioGO Store
 

2010 audio plays
Fourth Doctor audio plays